Dred Scott (c. 1799–1858) was an American slave who unsuccessfully sued for his freedom.

Dred Scott may also refer to:

Dred Scott v. Sandford, 1857 Supreme Court decision 
Dred Scott (rapper), rapper whose début album, Breakin' Combs,  was released in 1994

See also
Dread Scott, an American artist
Dred (disambiguation)
Scott (disambiguation)